The 2018–19 Vanderbilt Commodores women's basketball team represents Vanderbilt University in the 2018–19 NCAA Division I women's basketball season. The Commodores, led by third-year head coach Stephanie White, play their home games at Memorial Gymnasium and were members of the Southeastern Conference. They finished the season 7–23, 2–14 in SEC play to finish in last place. They lost in the first round of the SEC women's tournament to Alabama.

Previous season
They finished the 2017–18 season 7–24, 3–13 in SEC play to finish in a three-way tie for 11th place. They lost in the first round of the SEC women's tournament to Arkansas.

Roster

Schedule

|-
!colspan=6 style=| Exhibition

|-
!colspan=6 style=|Non-conference regular season

|-
!colspan=6 style=|SEC regular season

|-
!colspan=12 style=|SEC Tournament

See also
2018–19 Vanderbilt Commodores men's basketball team

References

Vanderbilt
Vanderbilt Commodores women's basketball seasons
Vanderbilt
Vanderbilt